Luca Marmorini (born 17 June 1961) is the former head of the engine and electronics department at the Ferrari Formula One team.

He stayed with Ferrari until , when he joined Toyota as it prepared to enter Formula One. After progressing to the position of technical director in charge of engines, he left Toyota on 19 January 2009, only to return to Ferrari on 6 October that year, replacing Frenchman Gilles Simon as head of the engine and electronics department.

He left the Scuderia Ferrari Team on 31 July 2014 and has been linked with Renault.

References

Living people
1961 births
Formula One engine engineers
Ferrari people
Italian motorsport people